The Red Orchestra was a communist spy ring in Nazi-occupied Europe during the Second World War. The name has the following derivatives:
Rote Kapelle (band), a Scottish band
The Red Chapel (Det Røde Kapel), a 2010 Danish documentary
KLK an PTX - Die rote Kapelle, a 1971 East German movie about the Red Orchestra
Die rote Kapelle, a 1972 West German television mini series about the Red Orchestra